Birds & Blooms is an American magazine about backyard plants, birds, butterflies, and other creatures.

History and profile
Birds & Blooms was started in 1995. The magazine has its editorial offices in Milwaukee, Wisconsin. The magazine is produced once every two months. Most of the articles and photographs in the magazine are reader-submitted, giving the magazine a non-scientific approach. It contains information on how to attract birds and other wildlife to the backyard and other information of interest to outdoor enthusiasts and amateur ornithologists and lepidopterists.

The magazine targets audiences from two hobby demographics: gardening and birdwatching. In 2008, 70% of American adults were involved in gardening, and 6.4% were bird-watchers.

In May 2005, Birds & Blooms began publishing Birds & Blooms EXTRA with magazine issues published six months a year on alternating months to the original Birds & Bloom magazine.

See also
Birdwatching
Gardening
List of ornithology journals

References

External links
Official website
Reiman Publications website

1995 establishments in Wisconsin
Bimonthly magazines published in the United States
Horticultural magazines
Journals and magazines relating to birding and ornithology
Magazines established in 1995
Magazines published in Wisconsin
Companies that filed for Chapter 11 bankruptcy in 2009
Companies that filed for Chapter 11 bankruptcy in 2012
Mass media in Milwaukee
Wildlife magazines